Cham Chareh or Cham Chara may refer to:

Cham Chareh 1
Cham Chareh 2
Cham Chareh 3

See also
Chareh (disambiguation)